Marc McCallum (born 27 March 1993) is a Scottish footballer who plays as a goalkeeper for Forfar Athletic. He has also previously played for Dundee United and Livingston, Plymouth Argyle, as well as an earlier stint at Forfar Athletic, Peterhead, Berwick Rangers, Arbroath and Livingston on loan. He has represented Scotland at under-17 and under-19 level.

Early life and career
McCallum was born in Forfar and played for Lochside Boys Club before joining Aberdeen at the age of 11. After spending eighteen months there he moved to Dundee United, later signing as a full-time professional in June 2009.

Playing career

Club
Before making his debut for Dundee United, McCallum had three separate spells out on loan, firstly he moved to Forfar Athletic for three months, on 31 December 2011. During the 2012–13 season he spent time at both Peterhead and Berwick Rangers.

After spending many seasons on loan in the lower divisions or as an unused substitute, McCallum finally made his Dundee United debut on 6 May 2014, in a 3–1 Scottish Premiership defeat to Aberdeen. On 13 May 2014, he signed a new contract keeping him at the club until 2016.

On 13 November 2014, McCallum signed for Arbroath on loan. He joined Livingston on loan in September 2015, returning to Dundee United in December 2015. McCallum left Dundee United in January 2016 by mutual consent, with the player looking to further his career by seeking first-team football. Shortly after leaving Tannadice, McCallum returned to Livingston signing a short-term deal until the end of the season.

In August 2016, McCallum signed for Plymouth Argyle as third choice goalkeeper, going on to make just two appearances in the 2016–17 season, both of which were as a substitute in EFL Trophy games, both times taking the place of Vincent Dorel.

McCallum rejected a new contract from Plymouth in the summer of 2017 and signed for Scottish League One club Forfar Athletic.

Career statistics

References

External links

http://www.arabarchive.co.uk/player.php?id=436 Arab Archive stats page

1993 births
Living people
Scottish footballers
Association football goalkeepers
Forfar Athletic F.C. players
Peterhead F.C. players
Berwick Rangers F.C. players
Dundee United F.C. players
Arbroath F.C. players
Livingston F.C. players
Plymouth Argyle F.C. players
Scottish Football League players
Scottish Professional Football League players
People from Forfar
Scotland youth international footballers
Footballers from Angus, Scotland